Córdoba, known officially as Heroica Córdoba, is a city and the seat of the municipality of the same name in the Mexican state of Veracruz. It was founded in 1618.

The city is composed of 15 barrios (neighborhoods) bounded to the north by Ixhuatlán del Café and Tomatlán, and to the south by Amatlán de los Reyes and Naranjal. The western area abuts Fortin de las Flores and the eastern area borders Amatlán de los Reyes and Peñuela.

Córdoba has a municipal area of 226 km.2 It is divided into 176 localities, of which the most important are San José de Tapia, las Flores, Miraflores, Los Naranjos, Brillante Crucero, el Porvenir, San Rafael Caleria, Santa Elena, San Miguelito, and San Nicolás.

This city is also known as The City of the Thirty Gentlemen since it was founded by 30 from the most important families of the region, due to the fact that it had to be founded due to the assaults that took place in the region near Yanga.

The city boasts of its historical importance, its colonial places and buildings, its cultural centers, parks and its gastronomy. Along with Fortín, Amatlán and Yanga, it forms part of a very important metropolitan area in the Altas Montañas region to form a large metropolitan area together with the City of Orizaba.

Natural geography
Córdoba is located in the center of the state of Veracruz, at 18º51'30" north latitude and 96º55'51" west longitude. It lies between the hills of Matlaquiahitl and Tepixtepec, at an elevation of 817 meters (2,680 feet) above mean sea level.

Its climate is warm and humid, with an annual average temperature of 19.8 °C (67.6 °F). There is abundant rainfall in summer and autumn, with little rain in winter.

History

Colonial period 
The village of Córdoba was founded in 1618 by the Spanish to protect royal interests from attacks by Gaspar Yanga's slave rebellion.

Mexican War of Independence 
After the capture of the city by Mexican rebel forces in August 1821, the Mexican revolutionary Agustín de Iturbide and the Spanish viceroy Juan de O'Donojú signed the Treaty of Córdoba here, ratifying the Plan de Iguala and confirming Mexico's independence.

In 1902 Córdoba became the interchange point of the narrow-gauge Córdoba and Huatusco Railroad to Coscomatepec.

Modern times
The city was severely damaged by the 1973 Veracruz earthquake.

Economy
The main economic activities are agriculture, ranching, industry and trade. The principal crops are sugar cane, coffee, avocado, orange, lemon, and rice, along with some non-traditional crops as anturios, heliconias and palma camedor.

A highway connects Córdoba with the state's principal port, Veracruz. There is an adequate workforce, with a relatively low annual wage, providing opportunities for hiring for industry.

Córdoba is the focal point for the local sugar milling and coffee processing industries, and it is also an important place for marketing and refining tropical fruits.
 
Several medical institutions provide public-health services in Córdoba, including the ISSSTE, the IMSS, and the SCSP. There is also a local Cruz Roja (Red Cross) hospital, and several private hospitals.

The city has a large number of entertainment centers, including billiard halls, ballrooms and discothèques. Cordoba has three libraries, three auditoriums, a theatre and a museum.

Transportation 
From 1902 to 1953, Córdoba was served by the Córdoba and Huatusco Railroad narrow gauge railroad. The line operated as a unique and scenic  gauge branch of Ferrocarril Mexicano from 1909 through 1951.

Demographics
According to the most current figures from the INEGI, the municipality of Córdoba has an approximate population of 204,721 inhabitants, which represents 2.57% of the total population of the State of Veracruz, which makes it the 4th. largest and most populous city in the state, surpassed only by Veracruz (552,156 inhabitants), Xalapa (457,928 inhabitants) and Coatzacoalcos (305,260 inhabitants). Of the total population of Córdoba, 95,960 are men and 108,761 are women, with the male-female ratio in 2010 being 87.7

Notable locations
One of Córdoba's most important locations is its zócalo (main square). The square, called the Parque de 21 de Mayo, uses the traditional Spanish layout, with a church on the east side, the Palacio Municipal (city hall) on the west, and commercial establishments on the north and south sides.

The Paso Coyol Ecological Park  is a  eco-conscious park that was once an abandoned lot.

Notable residents
Some of Córdoba's notable residents were:
Miguel Layún (professional footballer)
Rubén Bonifaz Nuño (poet and classical translator)
Raúl Mendoza (professional wrestler of WWE-NXT) 
Antonio Modesto Quirasco (politician)
Emilio Carballido (writer and dramatist)
Luis Cessa (Major League Baseball pitcher)
Jorge Cuesta (chemist and writer)
Diego Fernández de Córdoba, Marquis of Guadalcázar

International relations

Twin towns — Sister cities
Córdoba is twinned with:
 Baton Rouge, Louisiana, United States, since 2002

References

Link to tables of population data from Census of 2005 Instituto Nacional de Estadística, Geografía e Informática (INEGI)
Veracruz Enciclopedia de los Municipios de México, INAFED

External links
 Official website 
 Municipal Official Site 
 Municipal Official Information 
 Bienvenidos al site de Córdoba, Veracruz 
 News Homepage of Córdoba, Veracruz

 
Populated places in Veracruz
Populated places established in 1618
1618 establishments in the Spanish Empire